Georgia's 105th House District elects one member of the Georgia House of Representatives. 
Its current representative is Democrat Donna McLeod.

Elected representatives

References

Georgia House of Representatives districts
Gwinnett County, Georgia